Sticta parahumboldtii is a species of foliose lichen in the family Peltigeraceae. It is found in the Colombian Andes.

Taxonomy

The lichen was formally described as a new species by lichenologists Bibiana Moncada and Robert Lücking. The species epithet refers to its resemblance to and close association with Sticta humboldtii. The name "parahumboldtii" is derived from the Greek prefix "para," meaning "next to" or "near."

In a time-calibrated chronogram of the phylogeny of the genus Sticta, Sticta parahumboldtii was most closely related to S. hirsutofuliginosa and a clade containing S. atlantica, S. humboldtii, and S. arachnosylvatica.

Habitat and distribution

This species has been found in the Cordillera Central, Cordillera Occidental, and the western slopes of the Cordillera Oriental. Sticta parahumboldtii typically grows on mossy soil and epiphytically, frequently found in association with species of Metzgeria, Frullania, and Leptogium.

Sticta parahumboldtii is one of only a few species in the genus Sticta that possess an upper , a cyanobacterial photobiont, and lack vegetative . There are two other species in Colombia that share a very similar morphology: S. humboldtii and S. pseudohumboldtii.

References

parahumboldtii
Lichen species
Lichens described in 2013
Lichens of Colombia
Taxa named by Robert Lücking